This article is a list of episodes for long-running children's television series The Sooty Show.

The Sooty Show (**Harry Corbett Years**)

1955/1956: Series 1

Series titled Sooty until 1966.

1956/1957: Series 2

1957/1958: Series 3

1958/1959: Series 4

1959/1960: Series 5

1960/1961: Series 6

1961/1962: Series 7

1962: Series 8

Series now on weekly.

1963/1964: Series 9

1964: Series 10

1965: Series 11

1965/1966: Series 12

1966/1967: Series 13

1967: Series 14

Series now being renamed The Sooty Show.

ITV (THAMES) Era: 1968– 1992

1968: Series 1

1969: Series 2

1970: Series 3

1970: Series 4

1971: Series 5

1971: Series 6

1972: Series 7

1972: Series 8

This series had Wally Whyton and Matthew Corbett on every edition

1973: Series 9

Gerry Marsden and Matthew Corbett appear in every edition

1973: Series 10

1974: Series 11

Matthew Corbett from this series onwards appears on the show more regularly

1974/1975: Series 12

1975: Series 13

The Sooty Show (**Matthew Corbett Years**)

1976: Series 1

1977: Series 2

1978: Series 3

1980: Series 4

1981: Series 5

From this series onwards, all episodes were based in the Sooteries cottage, following a sitcom format.

1981: Series 6

1983: Series 7

(Note: these 1983 episodes were 10 minutes long and not the usual 20 mins)

1983/1984: Series 8
This series had a 20 episode run, the longest series of Sooty, Matthew Corbett era ever made.

{| class="wikitable plainrowheaders" style="width:98%;"
|-
! Title !! Original airdate
{{Episode list
 |Title=Episode 1 - The Dancer
 |OriginalAirDate= 
 |ShortSummary=A new series of adventures with Sooty and the gang. Sweep wants to become a ballet dancer and is helped with his ambition by Sooty and Soo. Matthew decides he can be as good as Sweep, but meets his downfall when his teacher turns out to be Bonnie Langford.
Guest starring Bonnie Langford
}}

|}

1985: Series 9 Note: all the episodes from this series had a running time of 15 minutes and not the usual 20 minutes1986: Series 10

1987: Series 11 Note: the episodes from this series were back to the usual running time of 20 minutes1988: Series 12

1988: Series 13

1989: Series 14

1990: Series 15

1991: Series 16

1992: Series 17

This was the final ever series of The Sooty Show'' as Thames Television lost its ITV franchise at the end of December 1992.

References
http://genome.ch.bbc.co.uk/
https://web.archive.org/web/20110711040317/http://www.fremantlearchivesales.com/footage_details.aspx?ID=2871&FremantleSource=2
BFI.org
http://www.thesootyshow.org (this site has a lot of the ITV episodes archived, so info comes from the footage itself)

Lists of British children's television series episodes
Sooty